Ewuare Xola Osayande is an American poet, political activist, author and lecturer. He is the founder of Talking Drum Communications, co-founder and director of POWER (People Organized Working to Eradicate Racism), and creator of Project ONUS: Redefining Black Manhood. He has written 14 books and given more than 500 lectures in locations ranging from prisons to Harvard University. Currently, he is Anti-Oppression Coordinator with Mennonite Central Committee.

Biography 
Ewuare X. Osayande was born in Camden, New Jersey. He became a committed social justice activist and organizer while a student at Fairleigh Dickinson University. Following the 1990 fatal shooting of Phillip Pannell Jr., a 14-year-old African American shot by a white policeman in Teaneck, New Jersey, Osayande organized protests and raised awareness about racially motivated police brutality. For over a decade, he has continued to analyze American culture and to educate people of all races about the history and current reality of racism and other forms of oppression.

This work continues with POWER, an organization Osayande co-founded with Jacqui Simmons. POWER offers anti-racist workshops including "Resisting Racism I: Understanding Race/Racism," "Resisting Racism II: Self-Determination & Accountability," "People of Color Empowerment," and "Battle for the Ballot." These educational programs are modeled upon the theories of anti-racist activist Wanda Lofton (1950–2002).

Early in Osayande's career as a writer, he met Gwendolyn Brooks, who read his poetry and encouraged him to keep writing, self-promote, and publish his works. As a result, Osayande founded Talking Drum Communications to publish his own books. He is a prolific author, having produced 14 books in 16 years. Osayande is still appreciated and supported by world-renowned authors in the African American canon: in 2007, Amiri Baraka wrote the introduction to Blood Luxury.

Achievements, awards and honors 

(2006) Walt Whitman Arts Center's Vanguard Writer's Award
(2005) Keynote Speaker, The Damascus Road Anti-Racism Conference
(2005) Keynote Speaker, The Men Stopping Violence National Conference
(2004) Keynote Speaker, The Global Climate Control Conference at Harvard University
(2002–04) First Poet-in-Residence, African American Studies Program, Rutgers University
(2000–03) National Coordinator, Black Radical Congress "Education Not Incarceration" campaign

Publications 

(2008). Misogyny & the Emcee: Sex, Race & Hip Hop
(2006). Art at War: Revolutionary Art Against Cultural Imperialism
(2005). Blood Luxury
(2005). Free the Land: Revisioning Environmentalism
(2004). Are White Christians Anti-Racist, or do They Just Want to be Forgiven
(2003). Black Anti-Ballistic Missives: Resisting War/Resisting Racism
(2001). 9/11: Riots in the Sky
(2001). Caught at the Crossroads Without a Map
(2000). Crucifixions in the Street: Race, Rap & Religion
(1999). So the Spoken Word Won't Be Broken: The Politics of the New Black Poetry
(1997). Gangsta Rap is Dead
(1996). Akoben: A Call to Action, Responding to the Ramifications of Racism in Black America
(1993). Kwanzaa: A Biblical Perspective (co-authored with J. E. Price)
(1992). Malcolm X: The Man or the Image

Poems and essays in other publications 

(2007). Men Speak Out: Profeminist Views on Gender, Sex and Power
(2007). The Revolution Will Not Be Funded: Beyond the Non-Profit Industrial Complex
(2007). This Poem is Sponsored By: A Collection of Critical Poetry by Corporate Watch
(2007). What Lies Beneath: Katrina, Race and the State of the Nation
(2003). "War Is the Enemy of the Poor: King Spoke the Truth About War. We Must Do the Same Today." The Other Side January 1, 2003. Vol 39; Issue 1, p. 36 (3).

References

External links 
 Official Website
 Believing Is Doing: An Interview with Ewuare Osayande
 Anti-Oppression Ministry of Mennonite Central Committee

Year of birth missing (living people)
Living people
Writers from Camden, New Jersey
African-American writers
American writers
Fairleigh Dickinson University alumni
21st-century African-American people